Głębowice  is a village in the administrative district of Gmina Wińsko, within Wołów County, Lower Silesian Voivodeship, in south-western Poland. Prior to 1945 it was in Germany.

The village has a population of 520.

Notable residents
 Walther Schroth (3 June 1882 – 6 October 1944), Wehrmacht general

References

Villages in Wołów County